may refer to:

, Japanese futsal player
, Japanese actor